Luisito M. Reyes (October 11, 1930 - September 24, 2019) was the former Governor of the province of Marinduque, Philippines.   He was the brother of former Immigration Commissioner Edmundo M. Reyes and the brother-in-law of then Governor Carmencita Reyes. Luisito Reyes graduated from University of Sto. Tomas with a degree in Mechanical and Electrical Engineering and ranked 3rd on the mechanical engineering board exams and ranked 7th in the electrical engineering board exams. He was the president of the Professional Society of Mechanical Engineering for a long time.

Vice Governor of Marinduque 
Reyes entered politics in 1980 after being the Chairman of the Professional Regulation Board for Mechanical Engineering for 20 years, winning as provincial vice governor. The Reyeses were under the Kilusang Bagong Lipunan Party of President Ferdinand Marcos. Reyes' Governor, Aristeo M. Lecaroz, was also from the KBL.

Governor of Marinduque 
Reyes was first elected Governor in 1988. As Governor, Reyes initiated many projects. The Boac Covered Court and the Jica Building in Marinduque National High School are just two of his projects in the province. During the term of Luisito Reyes, Marinduque was removed from the poorest Philippine Provinces. He was known to be the best governor Marinduque ever had.

References

1930 births
Governors of Marinduque
Kilusang Bagong Lipunan politicians
Lakas–CMD politicians
Lakas–CMD (1991) politicians
University of Santo Tomas alumni
2019 deaths